The Antequera–Granada high-speed rail line opened in 2019, linking the Spanish city of Granada to the AVE network via a branch from the existing Madrid–Málaga high-speed rail line at Antequera.

Background

The  line from Antequera to Granada is a part of the under construction Andalusian Transverse Axis high-speed rail line. The daily AVE train between Granada and Barcelona Sants connects the two cities in 6 h 25 min. S-102 and S-112 (Pato, max speed ) trains are used for these services and all trains call at Córdoba, offering a journey time of 90 min from Granada. The total cost of building the line was €1.4 billion.

Stations
After branching from the existing Antequera-Santa Ana railway station, the line serves Loja and Granada. In 2019, construction was set to begin on a €16 million underground AVE station in Antequera town centre, making Antequera the only city in Spain outside of Madrid to have two high-speed rail stops.

Services
The line is used by AVE services to Madrid and one daily service to Barcelona. In November 2019, a daily patronage of 2,600 passengers using these services was reported.

References

High-speed railway lines in Spain
Granada
Province of Granada
Rail transport in Andalusia
Railway lines opened in 2019
Standard gauge railways in Spain
2019 establishments in Spain